Kathy May was the defending champion but was upset in her first match against Mary Hamm.
Third-seed Laura duPont won the title beating Nancy Richey in the final.

Seeds
A champion seed is indicated in bold text while text in italics indicates the round in which that seed was eliminated.

Draw

Finals

Top half

Bottom half

References

U.S. Clay Court Championships
1977 U.S. Clay Court Championships